Territorial Council elections were held in the French overseas collectivity of Saint Martin on 20 March 2022.

Results

Analysis
As expected, the elections were hotly contested, with five of the six lists managing to qualify for the second round. The latter is necessary, as none of the lists having managed to win the absolute majority of the votes cast in the first round. The Rassemblement Saint-Martinois led by Louis Mussington finished first with 16 seats (an increase of 11), ahead of the Union for Democracy list of the outgoing chairman of the council, Daniel Gibbs, which lost 13 seats.

References

Saint Martin
Saint Martin
Elections in the Collectivity of Saint Martin
March 2022 events in France